Jerónimo de Carrión (1660–1721) was a Spanish baroque composer.

Carrión was born in Segovia and was a choirboy at Segovia Cathedral. From 1687 to 1690 he was maestro de capilla in Mondoñedo and then, after a year at Ourense, at Segovia Cathedral, taking up the position formerly filled by Miguel de Irízar who had died in 1684; he remained in this post from 1692 to his death in 1721.

Works 
 4 masses 
 28 psalms
 7 offices for the dead
 6 magnificats
 12 lamentations 
 16 motets
 more than 500 villancicos.

Discography 
 Carrión "Calendas, El Tiempo En Las Catedrales" Tonos al Nacimiento, a La Pasión y al Santísimo. Lamentaciones Del Viernes. Capilla Jerónimo de Carrión dir. Alicia Lázaro. Verso. 2006.
 Carrión "Ah de los elementos" - Misa de batalla. 7 villancicos on  Capilla Jerónimo de Carrión dir. Alicia Lázaro. Verso. 2007.

References 

Spanish Baroque composers
1660 births
1721 deaths
Spanish male classical composers
18th-century classical composers
18th-century male musicians
18th-century musicians